Hugh I (1194/1195 – 10 January 1218) succeeded to the throne of Cyprus on 1 April 1205 underage upon the death of his elderly father Aimery, King of Cyprus and Jerusalem. His mother was Eschiva of Ibelin, heiress of that branch of Ibelins who had held Bethsan and Ramleh.

Early life 

Hugh was the youngest of the three sons of Aimery of Lusignan, Lord of Cyprus, and his first wife, Eschiva of Ibelin. He was born between around 1194/1195 and 1199. Shortly after his birth, he lost his mother. Hugh and his two brothers, Guy and John, were engaged to the three daughters of Isabella I of Jerusalem (Maria of Montferrat, Alice of Champagne and Philippa of Champagne), as a sign of reconciliation between Cyprus and Jerusalem. Hugh was his father's only son to survive childhood.

Reign

Minority 

Hugh was still a minor when his father died on 1 April 1205. The High Court of Cyprus appointed his brother-in-law, Walter of Montbéliard, regent. Walter was also made Hugh's guardian, thus he seized the custody of both the kingdom and the young monarch. Walter intervened in a conflict over the possession of Satalia between the Sultanate of Rum and an adventurer, Aldobrandino, on the latter's behalf, but the Seldjuks captured the town with the assistance of the local Greeks.

Ruler of Cyprus 

Hugh reached the age of majority in September 1210. He called Walter of Montbéliard to account, stating that Walter had kept him in a "state of deprivation" during his minority. He demanded 240,000 white bezants from the ex-regent, claiming that 200,000 bezants had been in the royal treasury when his father died and he had spent 40,000 bezants to secure his own subsistence. Instead of rendering an account, Walter left Cyprus with the assistance of Bohemond IV of Antioch. John of Brienne, the new king of Jerusalem, gave shelter to Walter. In a letter sent to Pope Innocent III, Walter stated that Hugh had expelled him from Cyprus and confiscated his property without the judgement of the High Court.

Hugh concluded a treaty with the Seldjuq Sultan of Rum which guaranteed that the merchants from Cyprus and Rum could safely run their business in both countries. He gave his sister, Helvis, in marriage to Bohemond IV's rival, Raymond-Roupen, although she had been married to Odo of Dampierre (who was Walter of Montbéliard's kinsman). Odo of Dampierre urged the pope to intervene and prevent the new marriage. Hugh supported John of Brienne's opponents, according to a 1213 letter of Innocent III. The pope also rebuked him for capturing John of Brienne's vassals whom Muslim ships had forced to land at Cyprus.

Hugh especially favored the Knights Hospitaller. He exempted them of duties levied on goods bought or sold in Cyprus already at the beginning of his personal rule. He sent reinforcements to them in Syria in 1214.  

In September 1217, Hugh joined King Andrew II of Hungary on the Fifth Crusade in raiding Muslim lands in Galilee. On his return, he stopped in Tripoli to attend the wedding of his half-sister Melisende on 10 January 1218, but he became ill during the celebration and died. He was buried at the Church of the Hospitallers at Tripoli, then at the Church of the Hospitallers at Nicosia.

Family 

Hugh married Alice of Champagne, the elder daughter of Queen Isabella I of Jerusalem and her third husband, Count Henry II of Champagne. Alice was the heir presumptive to Isabella's successor, Queen Maria, at the time of the marriage. The marriage was celebrated before Hugh reached the age of majority in 1210, according to the Estoire de Eracles. Two other chronicles (Annales de Terre Sainte and Les gestes des Chiprois) misdated the marriage to 1211.

The couple had three children:
 Mary (before March 1215 – 5 July 1251 or 1253), who married Count Walter IV of Brienne in 1233 (ca. 1200 – murdered at Cairo, 1244). She became mother of Hugh of Brienne (ca. 1240–1296), who was Count of Lecce and Brienne and pursued the kingdoms in Levant for himself when his uncle Henry's line began to go extinct. This claim fell to her grandson Walter V of Brienne and his descendants. They are the heirs-general of King Aimery of Cyprus and Hugh I himself.
 Isabella (1216–1264), who married Henry of Antioch, and who was the mother of Hugh III of Cyprus and ancestress of the line named later as the second dynasty of Lusignan.
 Henry I (1217–1253), namesake of his maternal grandfather, who became King of Cyprus upon his father's death in 1218, with his mother acting as regent.

References

Sources 

 
 
 
 
 
 
 
 

Kings of Cyprus
13th-century monarchs in Europe
Christians of the Fifth Crusade
Medieval child monarchs
1190s births
1218 deaths
13th century in Cyprus
House of Ibelin